Dilivio Hoffman (born 11 June 1997) is a Dutch footballer who plays as a attacker for Ballkani.

Career

In 2016, Hoffman signed for Dutch third tier side Jong FC Twente. In 2017, he signed for FC Den Bosch in the Dutch second tier, where he made 4 league appearances and scored 0 goals. On 12 March 2018, Hoffman debuted for FC Den Bosch during a 1–3 loss to Helmond Sport. In 2019, he signed for Dutch third tier club De Treffers. Before the second half of 2021–22, he signed for Ballkani in Kosovo after trialing for Turkish team Samsunspor.

References

External links
 

1997 births
Association football forwards
De Treffers players
Dutch expatriate footballers
Dutch footballers
Eerste Divisie players
Expatriate footballers in Kosovo
FC Den Bosch players
Living people
SV TEC players
Tweede Divisie players
Jong FC Twente players